Revolutionary Party of National Unification (PRUN) was a political party in Mexico. PRUN was founded in 1939, to support the candidacy of General Juan Andreu Almazán in the 1940 presidential election. Almazán got 5.7% of the national vote.

References

Political parties established in 1939
Defunct political parties in Mexico
1939 establishments in Mexico

Political parties disestablished in 1940